Herman W. Waterman was a member of the Wisconsin State Assembly.

Biography
Waterman was born on January 7, 1868, in Portland, Maine. He moved to Milwaukee, Wisconsin in 1889.

Career
Waterman was elected to the Assembly in 1902. He was a Republican.

References

Politicians from Portland, Maine
Politicians from Milwaukee
Republican Party members of the Wisconsin State Assembly
1868 births
Year of death missing